The 1851 Texas gubernatorial election was held on August 4, 1851 to elect the governor of Texas. Incumbent Governor Peter Hansborough Bell was reelected to a second term, receiving 48% of the vote. His nearest challenger, Middleton T. Johnson, won just 19%.

Results

References

Gubernatorial
1851 United States gubernatorial elections
1851
August 1851 events